Sir Charles George Walpole FRGS (1848-1926) was Chief Justice of the Bahamas.

References

External links
http://www.epsomandewellhistoryexplorer.org.uk/DeTeissiers-Part1.html

Chief justices of the Bahamas
1848 births
1926 deaths
English justices of the peace
Fellows of the Royal Geographical Society
Knights Bachelor
People educated at Eton College
Alumni of Trinity College, Cambridge
Members of the Inner Temple
British Cyprus judges
Chief justices of Gibraltar